Péter Traply (born March 27, 1987) is Hungarian poker player. Traply is the first ever Hungarian to win a WSOP bracelet, back in 2009.

He started playing poker at the age of 18, grinding freeroll tournaments to build his bankroll, and was able to enter live tournaments before graduating from college. 

As of 2020, his total live tournament winnings exceed $900,000. 

Under the screen name "Belabacsi" (beɪlʌbɑːtʃi) he has won over $17,718,014 and made 10 PocketFives Triple Crowns.

Online Poker 
Mainly known as "Belabacsi" on Pokerstars and Fulltilt, Péter Traply also plays under the following aliases :

 HungarysHero (partypoker)
 kiskutya23 (888poker)
 OmeletteduFR (PokerStars.fr / Winamax.fr)

Péter Traply ranks as number one on the PocketFives All Time Money List, with $16,727,488 of total earnings online as of July 2019.

His biggest win was during a SCOOP Tournament back in May 2009, where he finished first in the $2,100 NLHE event for $312,360.

References

1987 births
Living people
Hungarian poker players
World Series of Poker bracelet winners
Sportspeople from Budapest